The 2014–15 Belarusian Extraliga season was the 23rd season of the Belarusian Extraliga, the top level of ice hockey in Belarus. Eleven teams participated in the league this season. HC Shakhtyor Soligorsk won both the regular season and the playoffs.

First round

Second round

Group A

Group B

Playoffs

External links 
Official site
Season on hockeyarchives.info

References 

bel
Belarusian Extraleague seasons
Extraleague